The Littorinidae are a taxonomic family of over 200 species of sea snails, marine gastropod molluscs in the clade Littorinimorpha, commonly known as periwinkles and found worldwide.

Names
In English-speaking countries, gastropod molluscs from other families, such as the Neritidae, are sometimes also commonly known as "winkles" because they are small, round snails that occupy a similar ecological niche.

Taxonomy
These subfamilies have been recognized in the taxonomy of Bouchet & Rocroi (2005):
 Subfamily Littorininae Children, 1834 – synonyms: Echinininae Rosewater, 1972; Tectariinae Rosewater, 1972; Melaraphidae Starobogatov & Sitnikova, 1983
 Subfamily Lacuninae Gray, 1857 – synonyms: Risellidae Kesteven, 1903; Cremnoconchinae Preston, 1915; Bembiciidae Finlay, 1928.
 Subfamily Laevilitorininae Reid, 1989

Genera within the family Littorinidae include:

Littorininae
 Afrolittorina Williams, Reid & Littlewood, 2003
 Austrolittorina Rosewater, 1970
 Cenchritis von Martens, 1900
 Echinolittorina Habe, 1956 – synonyms: Amerolittorina Reid, 2009; Fossarilittorina Rosewater, 1981; Granulilittorina Habe & Kosuge, 1966; Lineolittorina Reid, 2009
 Littoraria Griffith & Pidgeon, 1834 – 39 species
 Littorina Férussac, 1822 – 18 species – type genus
 Mainwaringia Nevill, 1885
 Melarhaphe Menke, 1828
 Nodilittorina von Martens, 1897 – this genus proved to be polyphyletic and in 2003 was divided into:
 Echinolittorina – 59 species worldwide
 Austrolittorina – five species
 Afrolittorina – four species
 Nodilittorina s.s. – the monotypic subgenus
 Peasiella - Nevill, 1885
 Tectarius Valenciennes, 1833 – 11 species, its synonym or subgenus includes: Echininus Clench & Abbott, 1942.

Lacuninae
 Bembicium Philippi, 1846
 Cremnoconchus Blanford, 1869 – freshwater snails living in waterfalls.
 Lacuna Turton, 1827 – synonym: Aquilonaria Dall, 1886
 Pellilitorina Pfeffer in Martens & Pfeffer, 1886
 Risellopsis Kesteven, 1902

Laevilitorininae
 Laevilacunaria Powell, 1951
 Laevilitorina Pfeiffer, 1886

subfamily ?
 Algamorda Dall, 1918
 Macquariella Finlay, 1927 (?)
 Rissolitorina Ponder, 1966

Synonyms
 Corneolitorina Powell, 1951: synonym of Laevilitorina (Laevilitorina) Pfeffer in Martens & Pfeffer, 1886 represented as Laevilitorina Pfeffer, 1886
 Haloconcha Dall, 1886 is a synonym for Lacunaria Dall, 1885
 Macquariella Finlay, 1926: synonym of Laevilitorina Pfeffer, 1886
 Rissolittorina Ponder, 1966: synonym of Laevilitorina Pfeffer, 1886

References

 
 Powell A. W. B., New Zealand Mollusca, William Collins Publishers Ltd, Auckland, New Zealand 1979

Further reading

 
Taxa named by John George Children